The 2022 Nashville SC season is the club's third season as a member of Major League Soccer. This season has the club returning to the Western Conference following the addition of Charlotte FC to the Eastern Conference.

Roster

Current roster

Competitions

Major League Soccer

Standings

Match results

MLS Cup Playoffs

First round

U.S. Open Cup

Due to finishing in the top four of their conference in 2021, Nashville SC will enter the tournament in the Round of 32, with draws announced April 22, 2022 and matches played May 10–11, 2022. This will be their first Open Cup campaign as a member of Major League Soccer, after competing in 2018 and 2019 as a member of the United Soccer League/USL Championship.

Leagues Cup

References

Nashville SC seasons
Nashville SC
Nashville SC
Nashville SC